Tomellana lineata, common name the wavy-line turrid, is a species of sea snail, a marine gastropod mollusk in the family Clavatulidae.

Description
The size of an adult shell varies between 20 mm and 45 mm. The shell is smooth with a body whorl more or less constricted above. The spire is sometimes very short, and sometimes long. The color of the shell is whitish or yellowish brown, thickly flexuously longitudinally lineated with chestnut or chocolate.

Distribution
This species occurs in the Atlantic Ocean from Senegal to Angola.

References

 Bernard, P.A. (Ed.) (1984). Coquillages du Gabon [Shells of Gabon]. Pierre A. Bernard: Libreville, Gabon. 140, 75 plates pp.
 Gofas, S.; Afonso, J.P.; Brandào, M. (Ed.). (S.a.). Conchas e Moluscos de Angola = Coquillages et Mollusques d'Angola. [Shells and molluscs of Angola]. Universidade Agostinho / Elf Aquitaine Angola: Angola. 140 pp

External links
 
 Specimen at MNHN, Paris

lineata
Gastropods described in 1816